Lyreus is a genus of cylindrical bark beetles in the family Zopheridae. There are at least three described species in Lyreus.

Species
These three species belong to the genus Lyreus:
 Lyreus alleni Ivie & Slipinski, 2001
 Lyreus septemstriatus Fancello & Leo, 1991
 Lyreus subterraneus Aubé, 1861

References

Further reading

 
 
 

Zopheridae
Articles created by Qbugbot